Stefan "Paule" Beinlich (born 13 January 1972) is a German former professional footballer, who played as a central midfielder.

His main asset was a powerful long-range shot, and he often scored from free kicks; he was one of the first players from the country to play in the Premier League, although he would have little impact at Aston Villa.

Club career
Beinlich was born in East Berlin, and played as a youth for BFC Dynamo, making his first senior appearances for their feeder club, SG Bergmann-Borsig, In 1991, he moved to England with Aston Villa, signing along with his compatriot Matthias Breitkreutz, but both players had unassuming stints, appearing very rarely during their three-year stay. Beinlich's only goal for Villa came in a 5–1 defeat to Newcastle United in April 1994.

In 1994, he moved to Hansa Rostock, helping it promote in his first year, and scoring 19 times in the following two top level seasons combined (34 in total). Beinlich continued to display excellent football in his three seasons with Bayer 04 Leverkusen; in his last year, he tied a career-best 11 goals (in the first division) as the club lost the league to FC Bayern Munich on goal difference.

After three years apiece with Hertha BSC and Hamburger SV, with relative playing time, Beinlich retired in 2008, after two seasons with former side Hansa. He had to retire due to knee problems, and totalled 288 games in the first division, scoring 56 goals.

International career
Beinlich's international debut for Germany occurred on 2 September 1998 against Malta, playing the whole 2–1 friendly win.

His last two matches were in 2000, also friendlies, before and after the European Championship, for which he was not picked.

Post-retirement
On 30 May 2010, Beinlich was officially presented as Hansa Rostock's new director of football. On 8 June 2012, after Hansa had been relegated, Beinlich announced that he would resign at the end of the month. In January 2013, he then became managing director of 1. LAV Rostock. On 27 November 2019, Beinlich returned to Hansa Rostock once again, this time as the club's academy manager. Beinlich also still remained his position at 1. LAV Rostock.

Honours
Hertha Berlin
DFL-Ligapokal: 2001

Hamburger SV
DFL-Ligapokal: 2003
UEFA Intertoto Cup: 2005

References

External links
 
 
 

1972 births
Living people
Footballers from Berlin
People from East Berlin
East German footballers
German footballers
Association football midfielders
Premier League players
SG Bergmann-Borsig players
Aston Villa F.C. players
Bundesliga players
2. Bundesliga players
FC Hansa Rostock players
Bayer 04 Leverkusen players
Hamburger SV players
Hertha BSC players
Germany international footballers
German expatriate footballers
Expatriate footballers in England